Lois Harjo Ball (1906–1982) was a Native American painter, basket maker, and ceramic artist from Okmulgee, Oklahoma, and a citizen of the Muscogee Nation.

Early life 
Ball was the daughter of Henry Marsey Harjo and Katie Monahwee. She was a grand-daughter of Muscogee chief Menawa. Ball graduated from Okmulgee High School in 1926 and

Art career 
Ball painted for her entire adult life. She supported native art and encouraged others to learn about their heritage. She studied at Oklahoma City University and Stephens College and is known for her paintings. Her works are in the collections of institutions including the Creek Council House and Museum in Okmulgee.

Legacy 
In particular, Ball was a strong influence on her grand-niece Joy Harjo, who was later a United States Poet Laureate. Joy Harjo dedicated her 1983 book She Had Some Horses to her great-aunt Lois.

A scholarship for Muscogee Nation students of fine arts, the Naomi & Lois Harjo Scholarship, is named in honor of Ball.

References 

Native American painters
Native American women artists
Painters from Oklahoma
Muscogee people
1906 births
1982 deaths
People from Okmulgee, Oklahoma
Oklahoma City University alumni
Stephens College alumni
20th-century Native American women
20th-century Native Americans